Seffrid I, sometimes known as Seffrid Pelochin, was a medieval Bishop of Chichester.

Life

Seffrid was the son of Seffrid d'Escures and Guimordis, and was a half brother to Ralph d'Escures, Archbishop of Canterbury from 1114 to 1122. He was a native of Escures, near Sées, and his father was a landowner and sworn man of Roger of Montgomery. He was a monk at Séez Abbey in Sées, France, and became abbot of Glastonbury Abbey in 1120. He acted as an emissary for King Henry I of England at the papal curia in Rome. In 1123 he went to Rome with Anselm of St Saba as part of William de Corbeil the newly elected Archbishop of Canterbury's party. William was traveling to Rome to secure his pallium. Seffrid was nominated to the see of Chichester about February 1125 and consecrated on 12 April 1125 by William de Corbeil, the Archbishop of Canterbury, at Lambeth. He was deprived of his see in 1145, and died sometime between 1150 and 1151. He was possibly deprived for homosexuality, and may have been buried at Glastonbury. Six genuine documents of his time as archbishop survive, along with his profession of obedience. Four of these documents were grants to monasteries, one dealt with his cathedral chapter's canon's, and the last is a grant of land.

Citations

References

Further reading

 

Anglo-Normans
Bishops of Chichester
12th-century English Roman Catholic bishops
Abbots of Glastonbury
1150s deaths
Year of birth unknown

Year of death uncertain